The Soimuș is a left tributary of the river Someș in Romania. It discharges into the Someș near Jibou.

References

Rivers of Romania
Rivers of Sălaj County